Elliot Johnson may refer to:

 Elliot Johnson (politician) (1862–1932), Australian politician and Speaker of the House of Representatives
 Elliot Johnson (baseball) (born 1984), Major League Baseball second baseman

See also
 Elliott Johnson (born 1975), American artist and designer
 Elliott Johnson (footballer) (born 1994), English footballer